W. Craig Carter is an American materials scientist, a POSCO Professor of Materials Science and Engineering at Massachusetts Institute of Technology. He is also a co-founder of the 24M Technologies Company.

He is a specialist in the fields of meso-scale modelling of materials properties and processing. His research is focused on thermodynamics and kinetics of interfaces, simulations of microstructural evolution, and predictions of fracture and reliability in materials. He has also worked on battery materials.

He is a MacVicar Fellow and has received the MIT School of Engineering Bose Teaching Award. He has also been a recipient of Wolfram Innovator Award. He is a fellow of American Ceramic Society.

Education
Carter studied material science and engineering and received his bachelor's, Masters and Doctoral degree from University of California, Berkeley in 1983, 1987, and 1989, respectively. He completed his post-doctoral studies in material science from NIST in 1991.

Academic career
Carter worked briefly at Rockwell International Science Center before working as a Research Scientist at NIST from 1992 till 1998. He then joined Massachusetts Institute of Technology as an Associate Professor of Material Science and Engineering and was promoted to Professor in 2003. In 2010, Carter co-founded 24M Technologies Company.

Research

Meso-scale modelling of materials properties and processing
Carter has conducted   research on theory and meso-scale modelling of materials properties and processing. He focused on thermodynamics and kinetics of interfaces and studied mathematical developments regarding surface evolution and equilibration problems related to crystalline surface energy anisotropy. In the mid 2000s, he introduced a new concept of interface complexion, for kinetic engineering in materials science and proved the existence of multiple interface complexions by thermodynamics in real material system.

He also studied simulations of microstructural evolution and discussed two-dimensional calculations of anisotropic growth and coarsening for simulating the development microstructure in materials. He studied the applications of digital image model and modified it to include elastic strain energy at solid-fluid interfaces. He co-authored a public domain software to model microstructural properties from experimental images.

Science of battery materials
In his later research, Carter directed his focus to the science of battery materials and the electro-chemo-mechanics of phase transitions and fracture of battery electrodes. He studied olivine compounds as enablers of positive electrode materials for high-power in lithium rechargeable batteries and discussed the miscibility gap in undoped Li1-xFePO4. He observed the elimination of the gap below a critical point.

He co-developed a flow battery that utilized co-suspensions of solid state electrode and electronically conductive particulates. His research demonstrated the fast rate capability and greater cycling stability in NaTi2(PO4)3/Na0.44MnO2 cells.

Other professional activities 
Carter has also designed software to create forms and textures. He collaborated with Neri Oxman of the MIT Media Lab on projects incorporating material science, mythology and natural designs. Carter is the designer of ONE.MIT which is a mosaic having more than 270,000 names from the MIT community etched on a 6-inch-diameter silicon wafer.

Awards and honors
1990 – Ross Coffin Purdy Award, American Ceramic Society
1996 – Robert Coble Young Scientist Award, American Ceramic Society
1999 – Fellow, American Ceramic Society
1999 – Technology of the Year, IndustryWeek Magazine 
2005 – R.M. Fulrath Award, American Ceramic Society 
2008 – Bose Award for Excellence in Teaching, MIT
2008 – MacVicar Distinguished Teaching Fellow, MIT
2012 – Wolfram Innovator of the Year, Wolfram Research
2017 – Outstanding Educator Award, American Ceramic Society

Bibliography

Books
Selected Works of John W. Cahn (1998) 
Kinetics of Materials (2005)

Selected articles
Cahn, J. W., Carter, W. C. (1996). Crystal shapes and phase equilibria: A common mathematical basis. Metallurgical and Materials Transactions a-Physical Metallurgy and Materials Science 27, 1431.
Kobayashi, R., Warren, J. A., & Carter, W. C. (2000). A continuum model of grain boundaries. Physica D: Nonlinear Phenomena, 140(1-2), 141–150.
Kobayashi, R. Warren, J. A., Carter, W. C. (2000). A continuum model of grain boundaries. Physica D 140, 141.
Tang, W., Carter, W. C., Cannon, R. M. (2006). Grain boundary transitions in binary alloys.  Physical Review Letters, 97.
Meethong, N., Huang, H. Y. S., Carter, W. C., & Chiang, Y. M. (2007). Size-dependent lithium miscibility gap in nanoscale Li1− x FePO4. Electrochemical and Solid State Letters, 10(5), A134.
Dillon, S. J., Tang, M., Carter, W. C., & Harmer, M. P. (2007). Complexion: a new concept for kinetic engineering in materials science. Acta Materialia, 55(18), 6208–6218. 
Meethong, N., Huang, H. Y., Speakman, S. A., Carter, W. C., & Chiang, Y. M. (2007). Strain accommodation during phase transformations in olivine‐based cathodes as a materials selection criterion for high‐power rechargeable batteries. Advanced Functional Materials, 17(7), 1115–1123.
Woodford, W. H., Chiang, Y. M., Carter, W. C. (2010). "Electrochemical Shock" of Intercalation Electrodes: A Fracture Mechanics Analysis. Journal of the Electrochemical Society, 157, A1052.
Duduta, M., Ho, B., Wood, V. C., Limthongkul, P., Brunini, V. E., Carter, W. C., & Chiang, Y. M. (2011). Semi‐Solid lithium rechargeable flow battery. Advanced Energy Materials, 1(4), 511–516.

References 

Living people
UC Berkeley College of Engineering alumni
MIT School of Engineering faculty
Fellows of the American Ceramic Society
1961 births